John Marshall was a Scottish footballer who played for Wellpark, Harmonic, Third Lanark and Scotland, mainly as an outside forward. Marshall played four times for Scotland between 1885 and 1887 and scored one goal on his debut in an 8–2 win against Ireland in March 1885. He was also selected for several of the Glasgow Football Association's challenge matches against other British city selections (a regular occurrence in the era), and at club level was a Scottish Cup winner with Third Lanark in 1889. He later became a football referee.

References

Sources

External links
London Hearts profile

Year of birth missing
Year of death missing
Scottish footballers
Scotland international footballers
Third Lanark A.C. players
Footballers from Glasgow
Association football forwards
Scottish football referees